"Bed" is a song by Trinidadian-American rapper Nicki Minaj from her fourth studio album, Queen (2018). It was released as the third song and second official single from the album following "Chun-Li" and "Barbie Tingz" on June 14, 2018, by Young Money Entertainment and Cash Money Records. The song was produced by Ben Billions, Beats Bailey, Supa Dups, and Messy; and features guest vocals by American singer Ariana Grande. It marks the fourth collaboration between the two. Commercially, the song peaked at number 42 on the US Billboard Hot 100, as well as reached the top 20 in Australia, Scotland, and the United Kingdom.

Background and release
Minaj and Grande collaborated on "Bang Bang" and "Get On Your Knees" in 2014. Ariana Grande released "Side to Side" featuring Nicki Minaj as the third single of her studio album Dangerous Woman (2016). It peaked at number four on the US Billboard Hot 100, becoming her first top-five single from the album in the chart. In May 2018, Grande revealed via Twitter that Minaj called her in the morning and recorded what would be their next musical collaboration. On June 4, Grande replied to a follower on the same social network suggesting that there would be more than one collaboration between her and Minaj to be released in 2018, the other one being "The Light Is Coming". On June 11, Minaj officially announced "Bed" as the second single from her upcoming fourth studio album Queen (2018). It was released on June 14 for digital download, along with the album pre-order. The single has an Instagram-influenced faded cover art, that features Minaj and Grande posing in a pool with bubbles.

Composition and lyrics
"Bed" was written by Minaj with LunchMoney Lewis, Mescon David Asher, Supa Dups, Brett Bailey, and Ben Diehl, while its production was done by the latter three alongside Messy. The track is three minutes and nine seconds long. It is a downtempo-inspired pop ballad. It employs a minimalist, tropical-infused instrumental, that was noted to be similar to Troye Sivan's "Dance to This" (2018). According to Spin, the song is about escaping to be intimate with a lover, with a third verse about oral sex. It references Lil Wayne's Tha Carter III album (2008) and singer Zayn Malik, with whom she later collaborated, on "No Candle No Light".

Critical reception

Joshua Copperman of Spin called the song "charming", "raunchy", and "forceful", and described the instrumental as "cloudy but decidedly pretty". He found it nearly identical to Troye Sivan's "Dance to This", which is "danceable" in opposite to "Bed" which "buries its groove in pure atmosphere". Mitch Findlay of HotNewHipHop said the song is "a breezy addition to Queen, an obligatory radio effort, tailor made for summer play." He adds that the track "serves as intimate companion piece to "Rich Sex", and will no doubt appeal to a different set of ears." Mackenzie Cummings-Grady of Billboard finds that the "bouncy bop" nature of the song shows that "the album, like Minaj's previous efforts, will be a combination of club-ready pop and hardcore hip hop."

Commercial performance
"Bed" debuted at number 43 on the US Billboard Hot 100 after a full week of tracking, with 19,000 downloads sold and 12 million streams. The song became Minaj's 91st entry on the chart, extending her record for most Hot 100 visits among women and tying James Brown for the seventh-best sum overall. It fell 24 positions to number 67 in its second week. In its fourth week, it rose to number 48, and later reached a peak of number 42 after her album Queen was released.

Outside the United States, "Bed" also reached the top 20 in Australia, Scotland, and the United Kingdom.

Music video

Development and release
On June 14, 2018, Minaj and Grande shared a 15-second video teaser for "Bed" via their Twitter accounts. It shows the two artists in a pool, lounging around in a foam bath. On June 19, Minaj posted another one-minute preview of the music video on YouTube. On July 4, she revealed via Instagram that the video will premiere two days later. On July 5, she shared a quick behind-the-scenes look at the video on her social media. It shows her rolling around on a beach dressed up as a mermaid with a green wig. The full music video premiered on Minaj's official YouTube and Vevo accounts on July 6, 2018. It was directed by Hype Williams, who previously directed Minaj's videos for "Massive Attack" (2010), "Stupid Hoe" (2012), and "Va Va Voom" (2012). The video features guest appearances by American football players Odell Beckham Jr. and Brad Wing. Alongside the first video's release, Minaj announced a second version of the video that was meant to premiere a week later but was ultimately cancelled.

Synopsis

The music video opens with Minaj as a mermaid on the ocean shore. With the sun glistening on her body, she flaunts her curvy assets and green hair. She then retires to the bedroom in "sexy" lingerie as she rolls around in a mattress, before hitting the beach with Grande for some more fun in the sun. The two women later share strawberries with Beckham and Wing as their on-screen love interests on the beach. Grande does several showstopping looks of her own in the video, including white lingerie.

Controversy

On July 5, 2018, when the behind-the-scenes video for the song was released, rapper Azealia Banks posted a series of tweets criticizing Minaj for wearing a mermaid tail in the video. Banks suggested that Minaj stole that idea from her own aquatic-themed concepts dating back to her 2012 debut mixtape Fantasea. She described Minaj as being "so damn corny" and said her "hips and booty (are) too big for that mermaid tail," giving her "aunty chicken of the sea tuna in a can baked potato vibes". She also accused Minaj of copying, saying: "Did she invent any of the shit she stole from Lil Kim and accuses female rappers of stealing from her? Or was I really the first rap mermaid???".

Credits and personnel
Credits and personnel adapted from Queen album liner notes.

Recording
 Recorded at Criteria Studios, Miami, Florida
 Mixed at MixStar Studios, Virginia Beach, Virginia
 Mastered at Chris Athen Masters, Austin, Texas

Personnel
 Nicki Minaj – vocals, songwriting
 Ariana Grande – featured vocals
 Ben Diehl – songwriting 
 Gamal Lewis – songwriting 
 Mescon David Asher – songwriting 
 Ben Billions – production
 Brett "Beats" Bailey – production, songwriting 
 Dwayne "Supa Dups" Chin-Quee – production, songwriting
 Messy – co-production
 Aubry "Big Juice" Delaine – record engineering
 Nick Valentin – record engineering assistance
 William Knauft – record engineering assistance
 Serban Ghenea – mixing
 John Hanes – mixing assistance
 Chris Athens – mastering

Photographer

 Alfredo Flores (cover art)

Charts

Certifications

Release history

References

External links
 

2010s ballads
2018 songs
2018 singles
Ariana Grande songs
Cash Money Records singles
Female vocal duets
Music videos directed by Hype Williams
Nicki Minaj songs
Pop ballads
Republic Records singles
Songs written by Nicki Minaj
Songs written by Supa Dups
Songs written by LunchMoney Lewis
Young Money Entertainment singles